Andreas Bauer may refer to:

 Andreas Friedrich Bauer (1783–1860), German engineer
 Andreas Bauer (ski jumper) (born 1964), German former ski jumper
 Andreas Bauer Kanabas, German operatic bass, until December 2018 Andreas Bauer
 Andreas Bauer (boxer) (born 1960), German Olympic boxer
 Andreas Bauer (rugby league) (born 1982), rugby league player
 Andreas Bauer (footballer) (born 1985), Austrian footballer